Indar Jit Rikhye (30 July 1920 – 21 May 2007) was a major general in the Indian Army who served as military adviser to the United Nations Secretary-General Dag Hammarskjöld and U Thant in the 1960s. As military advisor, he was responsible for operations in the Democratic Republic of the Congo, Rwanda, Burundi, West Irian, Yemen, and Cyprus. Special assignments included advisor to the Secretary-General during the Cuban Missile Crisis, chief of the UN Observer Mission to the Dominican Republic, and participant in the Spinelli-Rikhye Mission to Jordan and Israel in 1965.

In May 1967, General Rikhye was the commander of the United Nations Emergency Force in the Sinai Peninsula when Egypt deployed its own troops in that territory and demanded that Rikhye withdraw all his troops. U.N. Secretary-General U Thant complied with the withdrawal, precipitating the Six-Day War the following month.

From 1970 to 1990, he was president of the International Peace Academy, a New York-based organization that promotes the settlement of armed conflicts by training negotiators, diplomats and military personnel in peacekeeping.

Gen. Rikhye (pronounced Rickey) had a distinguished 30-year career in the Indian Army. He attended the Indian Military Academy, Dehradun and was commissioned in December 1940. He served with the 6th Duke of Connaught's Own Lancers (Watson's Horse) during World War II. In 1947 he saw action in Jammu and Kashmir commanding 'B' Squadron 7th Light Cavalry. He went on to command the Deccan Horse Apr 1948 - Feb 1951.

Starting in the late 1950s he was assigned to U.N. peacekeeping units. He was credited with combining great resolve as a coordinator with physical courage.

General Rikhye is the author of numerous publications including The Thin Blue Line: International Peacekeeping and its Future.

References
Washington Post obituary
Profile of Gen. Rikhye
Indar Jit Rikhye, NY Times obituary
Economist obituary
Regents of the University of California
indiequill obituary

1920 births
2007 deaths
Indian generals
Indian officials of the United Nations
British Indian Army officers
Indian Army personnel of World War II
United Nations peacekeeping